RS Settat, also called Renaissance Sportive de Settat is a Moroccan football club located in the Moroccan city of Settat. Founded in 1946 the current Chairman is Rachid Azmy and the current manager is Abdellatif Killech.

Honours

Botola : 1
1970–71

Moroccan Throne Cup : 1
1970–69
Runner-up : 1967, 1970, 2000

Maghreb Cup Winners Cup : 1
1969–70

Performance in CAF competitions
CAF Cup: 1 appearance
1998 – Quarter-Finals

References
The Rec.Sport.Soccer Statistics Foundation

 
Football clubs in Morocco
1946 establishments in Morocco
Sports clubs in Morocco